The Lucerne Gold Collar is a breed of fancy pigeon developed over many years of selective breeding. Lucerne Gold Collars, along with other varieties of domesticated pigeons, are all descendants from the rock pigeon (Columba livia).
The collar is required to be a rich but clear golden yellow.

History
This breed as the name suggests originated in Lucerne, Switzerland. The breed is a variety of Swiss Lucerne peak crested pigeon.

See also 

List of pigeon breeds

References

Pigeon breeds
Pigeon breeds originating in Switzerland